Mario Meini (born 17 November 1946) is an Italian ordinary of the Catholic Church and the current Bishop of Fiesole.

Biography 
Mario Meini was born on 17 November 1946 in Legoli, a village in the Italian comune of Peccioli, which is located in Tuscany. He received his secondary education at the Minor Seminary of Volterra and studied theology at the Pontifical Regional Seminary "Pius XII" of Siena. He later received a doctorate in theology at the Pontifical Gregorian University in Rome.

As such, on 27 June 1971, Meini was ordained a Catholic priest in the Diocese of Volterra. On 13 July 1996, Pope John Paul II announced that he would appoint Meini to succeed Giacomo Babini as Bishop of Pitigliano-Sovana-Orbetello.

On 7 September 1996, he was consecrated a bishop, the principal consecrator being Vasco Giuseppe Bertelli, Bishop of Volterra, and the co-consecrators being Ovidio Lari and Antonio Bagnoli, Bishops Emeriti of Aosta and Fiesole, respectively. As bishop, Meini took the Latin motto "Pax et Lux," which in English means "Peace and Light."

Following a pastoral visit on 25 May 2002, Meini announced that there would be a diocesan synod, and promulgated the synodal documents on 22 March 2005.

Pope Benedict XVI. appointed Meini to succeed Luciano Giovannetti as Bishop of Fiesole on 13 February 2010. He assumed his bishopric on 18 April 2010. Guglielmo Borghetti, for whom Meini had been the principal consecrator on 15 September 2010, succeeded Meini as Bishop of Pitigliano-Sovana-Orbetello.

On 11 November 2014, Meini was elected Vice President for Central Italy of the Italian Episcopal Conference.

References

External links 

 Diocese of Fiesole
 Italian Episcopal Conference

21st-century Italian Roman Catholic bishops
20th-century Italian Roman Catholic bishops
Living people
1946 births
Bishops in Tuscany
Pontifical Gregorian University alumni
People from the Province of Pisa
People from Fiesole